DEAE-Sepharose is a tradename for the anion-exchange reactive group, diethylaminoethanol (DEAE) covalently linked to Sepharose  (a polysaccharide polymer).

References

External links 
 

Polysaccharides